Eero Haapala (born 10 July 1989) is a Finnish long jumper. He is the current holder of Finnish indoor record of men's long jump.

At the 2013 European Athletics Indoor Championships in Gothenburg Haapala finished on fourth place. He withdrew the 2013 World Championships due to a repeating injury.

References 

1989 births
People from Jalasjärvi
Finnish male long jumpers
Living people
Sportspeople from South Ostrobothnia